Sugar Camp is an unincorporated community located in the town of Sugar Camp, Oneida County, Wisconsin, United States.

Images

References

External links

Unincorporated communities in Oneida County, Wisconsin
Unincorporated communities in Wisconsin